Florian Hysenaj (born 20 July 2001) is a Kosovar professional footballer who plays as a centre-forward for Lausanne-Sport.

Club career

Lausanne-Sport
On 20 March 2019, Hysenaj made his debut with U21 team in a 2–0 home win against FC Bulle after coming on as a substitute at 82nd minute in place of Stéphane Cueni. Nineteen month later, he made his debut as professional footballer with senior team in a 0–1 home defeat against Lugano after coming on as a substitute at 75th minute in place of Lucas Da Cunha.

International career
On 7 October 2017, Hysenaj was named as part of the Kosovo U17 squad for 2018 UEFA European Under-17 Championship qualifications. Three days later, he made his debut with Kosovo U17 in match against Netherlands U17 after being named in the starting line-up.

Career statistics

Club

References

External links

2001 births
People from Nyon
Sportspeople from the canton of Vaud
Swiss people of Kosovan descent
Swiss people of Albanian descent
Living people
Kosovan footballers
Kosovo youth international footballers
Swiss men's footballers
Association football forwards
FC Lausanne-Sport players
FC Stade Lausanne Ouchy players
Swiss 1. Liga (football) players
Swiss Super League players
Swiss Challenge League players
2. Liga Interregional players